Shoto or Shōtō may refer to:

 Shoto (sword), a Japanese sword

Places
 Shoto-ko, a former name of Songdo Point in North Korea
 Shōtō, Shibuya, a residential district of Tokyo, Japan

Fictional characters
 Shoto Todoroki, a character in the Japanese superhero manga series My Hero Academia
 Akilhide Karatsu, a character in Ready Player One whose OASIS persona is Shoto.